Jonorana (possibly from Aymara for a variety of potato of the qhini group) is a  mountain in the Vilcanota mountain range in the Andes of Peru. It is situated in the Puno Region, Carabaya Province, Corani District, and in the Melgar Province, Nuñoa District. Jonorana lies east of Jatuncucho and southeast of Jampatune and Pomanota.

References

Mountains of Peru
Mountains of Puno Region